Sardar Ali Gohar Khan Mahar (born 1 September 1968) is a Pakistani politician who has been a member of the Provincial Assembly of Sindh since August 2018. He previously had been a member of the National Assembly of Pakistan, from June 2013 to May 2018 and had been a member of the Provincial Assembly of Sindh from 1993 to 1999.

Early life and family
He was born on 1 September 1968.

He is the brother of Ali Nawaz Khan Mehar and Ali Mohammad Mahar.

Political career

He ran for the seat of the Provincial Assembly of Sindh as an independent candidate from Constituency PS-3 (Sukkur-III) in 1990 Pakistani general election but was unsuccessful. He received 90 votes and lost the seat to an independent candidate, Ali Anwar Khan.

He was elected to the Provincial Assembly of Sindh as a candidate of Pakistan Muslim League (N) (PML-N) from Constituency PS-3 (Ghotki-III) in 1993 Pakistani general election. He received 26,853 votes and defeated Mehboob Ali Shah, a candidate of Pakistan Peoples Party (PPP).

He was re-elected to the Provincial Assembly of Sindh as a candidate of PPP from Constituency PS-3 (Ghotki-III) in 1997 Pakistani general election. He received 28,472 votes and defeated Umeed Ali Chachar.

In June 2006, he was re-elected as District Nazim of Ghotki.

He ran for the seat of the National Assembly of Pakistan and Provincial Assembly of Sindh as an independent candidate from Constituency NA-201 (Ghotki-II) and from Constituency PS-8 (Ghotki-IV), respectively in 2013 Pakistani general election, but was unsuccessful. He received 569 votes from Constituency NA-201 (Ghotki-II) and lose the seat to Ali Mohammad Mahar. He received 17 votes from Constituency PS-8 (Ghotki-IV) and lost the seat to Muhammad Bux Khan Mahar. In the same election, he was elected to the National Assembly as a candidate of PPP from Constituency NA-200 (Ghotki-I). He received 86,579 votes and defeated an independent candidate, Khalid Ahmed Khan Lund.

He was re-elected to Provincial Assembly of Sindh as a candidate of the Grand Democratic Alliance (GDA) from PS-20 Ghotki-III in the 2018 Sindh provincial election.

References

Living people
Pakistan People's Party politicians
Sindhi people
Pakistani MNAs 2013–2018
People from Sindh
1968 births
Sindh MPAs 1993–1996
Sindh MPAs 1997–1999
Grand Democratic Alliance MPAs (Sindh)
Sindh MPAs 2018–2023
Saraiki people
Ali Gohar Khan